The women's 800 metres at the 2018 IAAF World Indoor Championships took place on 3 and 4 March 2018.

Summary
In the heats, Olympic and returning bronze medalist Margaret Wambui was the victim of another disqualification.

In the final, Ajeé Wilson sprinted the first turn to take the lead at the break.  But then she relaxed into a more reasonable pace.  Habitam Alemu took up the second position for a lap before, defending champion Francine Niyonsaba came forward at a faster pace.   Wilson again sprinted to maintain position.  After a 59.02 first 400m, Alemu accelerate on the backstretch, to try to pass Niyonsaba, who sprinted a few steps to rebuff that effort.  At the bell, Niyonsaba attacked again, but Wilson sprinted the penultimate turn to keep Niyonsaba on the outside, the two pulling away from the rest of the field.  Well behind the battle for the lead, Shelayna Oskan-Clarke had been running in fifth place, began to move forward.  On the final backstretch, Niyonsaba ran past Wilson, and pulled away on the homestretch, celebrating a 5-metre win to retain her championship.  Wilson repeated her silver medal from 2016.  Oskan-Clarke took Alemu coming off the final turn to take bronze.

Results

Heats
The heats were started on 3 March at 11:50.

Final

The final was started on March 4 at 15:58.

References

800 metres
800 metres at the World Athletics Indoor Championships
2018 in women's athletics